Timbellus bednalli, common name Bednall's murex, is a species of sea snail, a marine gastropod mollusk in the family Muricidae, the rock snails or murex snails.

Description
The size of an adult shell varies between 32 mm and 85 mm.

Distribution
This species is found  along North and West Australia.

References

 Merle D., Garrigues B. & Pointier J.-P. (2011) Fossil and Recent Muricidae of the world. Part Muricinae. Hackenheim: Conchbooks. 648 pp. page(s): 133

External links 

 

Muricidae
Gastropods described in 1878